Stanton is a city in and the county seat of Martin County, Texas, United States. Stanton was founded as Marienfeld by German immigrants that were some of the first settlers in this region of Texas. The population was 2,492 at the 2010 census.

History

In 1887, New York native John Scharbauer established a cattle ranch in what later became known as Stanton.

Geography

Stanton is located at  (32.130740, –101.792072).

Demographics

2020 census

As of the 2020 United States census, there were 2,657 people, 889 households, and 711 families residing in the city.

2000 census
As of the census of 2000, there were 2,556 people, 854 households, and 651 families living in the city. The population density was 1,458.1 people per square mile (563.9/km). There were 1,002 housing units at an average density of 571.6 per square mile (221.1/km). The racial makeup of the city was 73.98% White, 2.86% African American, 0.74% Native American, 0.31% Asian, 19.56% from other races, and 2.54% from two or more races. Hispanic or Latino of any race were 52.90% of the population.

There were 854 households, out of which 44.8% had children under the age of 18 living with them, 59.0% were married couples living together, 13.7% had a female householder with no husband present, and 23.7% were non-families. 22.7% of all households were made up of individuals, and 13.0% had someone living alone who was 65 years of age or older. The average household size was 2.92 and the average family size was 3.44.

In the city, the population was spread out, with 35.0% under the age of 18, 7.9% from 18 to 24, 26.0% from 25 to 44, 16.7% from 45 to 64, and 14.4% who were 65 years of age or older. The median age was 30 years. For every 100 females, there were 87.4 males. For every 100 females age 18 and over, there were 84.9 males.

The median income for a household in the city was $27,961, and the median income for a family was $32,768. Males had a median income of $27,647 versus $18,333 for females. The per capita income for the city was $13,634. About 19.7% of families and 22.0% of the population were below the poverty line, including 26.0% of those under age 18 and 22.0% of those age 65 or over.

Education
Residents are in the Stanton Independent School District.

Notable people

Craig Eiland, Texas state representative from Galveston;  born in Stanton in 1962

References

External links
 "STANTON, TX," Handbook of Texas Online

Cities in Martin County, Texas
Cities in Texas
County seats in Texas
Cities in Midland–Odessa